The 2022 Midlothian Council election took place on 5 May 2022 as part of the 2022 Scottish local elections. The election used the seven wards created under the Local Governance (Scotland) Act 2004, with 23 councillors being elected. Each ward elected either three members, using the STV electoral system.

For the first time, the Scottish National Party emerged as the largest party on the council with eight seats, with Scottish Labour winning seven and the Scottish Conservatives three.

Results

Wards

Penicuik
2017: 1xCon; 1xSNP; 1xLab
2022: 2xSNP; 1xLab
2017-2022: 1 SNP gain from Con

Bonnyrigg
2017: 1xLab; 1xSNP; 1xCon
2022: 1xLab; 1xSNP; 1xCon
2017-2022 Change: No change

Dalkeith
2017: 2xLab; 1xSNP
2022: 2xLab; 1xSNP
2017-2022 Change: No change

Midlothian West
2012: 2xSNP; 1xLab
2017: 1xCon; 1xSNP; 1xLab
2012-2017 Change: 1 Con gain from SNP

Midlothian East
2017: 1xCon; 1xSNP; 1xLab
2022: 1xCon; 1xSNP; 1xLab
2017-2022 Change: No change

Midlothian South
2017: 1xLab; 1xSNP; 1xCon
2022: 2xSNP; 1xLab
2017-2022 Change: 1 SNP gain from Con

Aftermath
On 24 May, the SNP group announced that it had secured support to run a minority administration in Midlothian. Kelly Parry was elected leader of the council with Debbi McCall serving as provost.

Notes

References 

Midlothian Council elections
Midlothian